Troy Broadbridge (5 October 1980 – 26 December 2004) was an Australian rules footballer with the Melbourne Football Club in the Australian Football League (AFL).

AFL career

Melbourne career (2001–2004)
Broadbridge began his career as a defender with South Australian National Football League (SANFL) club Port Adelaide, the team his father Wayne played for, and was drafted by the Melbourne Football Club at the beginning of the 2001 AFL season. He won the club's Most Improved Player award in 2001, and became a regular in the side, playing a total of 40 games over his three seasons.

Broadbridge's first and last AFL games were both against  – he made his debut in Round 8, 2001, in the teams' first meeting since the 2000 Grand Final, while his last league game was also against Essendon, in the 2004 elimination final. On both occasions, Melbourne lost. His final game of football at any level was in the 2004 premiership team of Melbourne's , Sandringham.

Marriage and death
Broadbridge married Trisha Silvers on 18 December 2004. On 26 December, while spending their honeymoon in the Phi Phi Islands, Thailand, he drowned after being swept out to sea by the tsunami that followed the Indian Ocean earthquake, but Silvers survived. His father located his body in a Thai morgue on 3 January 2005.

Legacy
Trisha wrote a book about the events, Beyond The Wave, and was named as the 2006 Young Australian of the Year for her volunteer work for various charities, including building a school on Phi Phi named in Troy Broadbridge's honour.

In Melbourne's first match of the 2005 season, played against Essendon, the Demons all wore black armbands with number 20 sported on them in memory of Broadbridge. The Demons won that game and dedicated the win to him and his widow, Trisha. Broadbridge's number 20 guernsey was retired for the following two seasons (2005–2006), and it was revived in 2007 by new player Colin Garland.

Since 2007, the Troy Broadbridge Memorial Trophy has been awarded to any Melbourne-listed player that accumulates the most votes for the club's VFL affiliate.

Melbourne captain Max Gawn paid tribute to Broadbridge, among other deceased club identities, in a post-match interview upon the club winning the 2021 AFL Grand Final.

References

External links

DemonWiki profile

1980 births
2004 deaths
Australian rules footballers from South Australia
Melbourne Football Club players
Port Adelaide Magpies players
Sandringham Football Club players
Place of birth missing
Victims of the 2004 Indian Ocean earthquake and tsunami
Natural disaster deaths in Thailand
Deaths by drowning in Australia